Babken Melkonyan (born 4 March 1980, Yerevan, Armenia) is an Armenian amateur snooker & pool player, who participated in
the EBSA European Snooker Championships 2010 and the WPA World Nine-ball Championship 2014.

Career

In Pool

2013

In April, he reached the final of the Romanian National Championship of ten ball, but lost 3–7 to Ovidiu Cristea. At the Dynamic Italy Open 2013 he finished 33rd place, defeated to Tobias Bongers.

2015
In February 2015 Melkonyan was knocked out in the first round of the 10-Ball Championship.

Titles
 2021 Kremlin Cup
 2022 Black Sea Cup

In Snooker
He won the National Championship of Romania in 2010. In the same year, Melkonyan participated in the EBSA European Snooker Championships, where he left the tournament at the group stage. Group A table:

External links
 Profile at propool.ru 
 Profile at snooker.ro 

1980 births
Living people
Sportspeople from Yerevan
Armenian snooker players